Stephen Sowerby (born 14 March 1955) is a British modern pentathlete. He competed at the 1984 Summer Olympics.

References

External links
 

1955 births
Living people
British male modern pentathletes
Olympic modern pentathletes of Great Britain
Modern pentathletes at the 1984 Summer Olympics
Sportspeople from Harrogate